Chelsey Crisp (born June 5, 1983) is an American actress, comedian, and writer. She is best known for her role as Honey Ellis on the ABC television sitcom Fresh Off the Boat.

Early life
Crisp was born in 1983 and raised in Phoenix, Arizona, where she began performing in community theatre. She graduated from Agua Fria High School.

She attended the American Academy of Dramatic Arts from 2001 to 2003. After graduating, she studied Shakespeare at the British American Dramatic Academy's Midsummer in Oxford program.

Career
She made her TV debut on Scare Tactics (2004) and her first leading role in a film was in Dr. Chopper (2005). She went on to guest star in The Office, CSI: Miami, Journeyman, Better off Ted, Happy Endings, Rizzoli & Isles, Mike & Molly, and New Girl, among others. Crisp also starred as Chloe, one of the contestants on the mock reality game show, The Joe Schmo Show.

Crisp starred in the ABC comedy series Fresh Off the Boat as the Huang family's neighbor, Honey. Fresh off the Boat is inspired by the life of chef and food personality Eddie Huang and his book Fresh Off the Boat: A Memoir. On May 12, 2017, ABC renewed the series for a fourth season.

Crisp had roles in films Reconciliation (2009), Bleed (2016) and The 60 Yard Line (2016). She portrayed Jesse in the Christian-themed romantic comedy film In-Lawfully Yours (2016). The film centers around Jesse, played by Crisp, who graciously helps her recently widowed mother-in-law.

Crisp is the artistic director and member of the comedy team Duchess Riot, formed in 2011, that performs improv and sketch comedy.

Personal life
Chelsey Crisp has been married to screenwriter Rhett Reese since 2016. They reside in Los Angeles.

Filmography

Film

Television

References

External links
 

Living people
American film actresses
American television actresses
Place of birth missing (living people)
American television writers
1983 births
American women comedians
American women television writers
21st-century American actresses
21st-century American comedians
21st-century American screenwriters
Actresses from Phoenix, Arizona
Comedians from Arizona